199th may refer to:

199th (Manchester) Brigade, formation of the British Army during the First World War
199th Battalion Duchess of Connaught's Own Irish Rangers, CEF, unit in the Canadian Expeditionary Force during the First World War
199th Brigade (People's Republic of China), one of the five maneuver elements of the 26th Group Army in the Jinan Military Region
199th Fighter Squadron, unit of the Hawaii Air National Guard 154th Wing located at Joint Base Pearl Harbor-Hickam, Honolulu, Hawaii
199th Infantry Brigade (United States), unit of the United States Army
199th New York State Legislature, the New York State Senate and the New York State Assembly, from January 1, 2011, to June 24, 2012
199th Street (Manhattan)
National Lampoon The 199th Birthday Book, American humor book that was issued in 1975 in paperback
Pennsylvania's 199th Representative District

See also
199 (number)
199, the year 199 (CXCIX) of the Julian calendar
199 BC